The Wexford Senior Hurling Championship (known for sponsorship reasons as the Pettitt's SuperValu Senior Hurling Championship) is an annual hurling competition contested by top-tier Wexford GAA clubs. The Wexford County Board of the Gaelic Athletic Association has organised it since 1889.

Ferns St Aidan's are the title holders (2022) after defeating St Martin's by 1-20 to 0-22 in the final.

History

The title has been won at least once by 28 different teams. The all-time record-holders are Rathnure who have won a total of 20 titles.

Since 1994 the Wexford County Championship has been sponsored by Wexford-based supermarket Pettitt's SuperValu. It is one of the longest sponsorship deals of any county championship in Ireland.

Format
12 teams participated in the 2021 Wexford Senior Hurling Championship. 

The series of games are played during the spring and autumn months with the county final currently being played at Chadwicks Wexford Park in October. Initially played as a knock-out competition, the championship currently uses a round robin format followed by a knock-out stage.

The Wexford County Championship features a group stage followed by a knock-out stage. Each team in the championship is guaranteed at least five games. Relegation and promotion also takes place with the second tier Wexford Intermediate Hurling Championship.

For the group stage there are two groups of six teams. Teams play the other five teams in the group once, and match points are awarded depending on the result of each game, with teams receiving two points for a win, and one for a draw.

Following the completion of the group stage, the top four-ranking teams in each group qualify for the knock-out stage of the championship. The bottom-placed team in each group contest the relegation play-off.

The four quarter-finals consist of the top four teams from Group 1 and Group 2. The winners of the quarter-finals advance to the semi-finals with the two winners of these games contesting the final.

Honours

The winning team is presented with the Dr. R. J. Bowe Cup. A native of Enniscorthy, Bowe served as team doctor to the Wexford senior hurling team for a period of 25 years from the 1960s until the late 1980s.

The Wexford Senior Hurling Championship winners qualify for the subsequent Leinster Senior Club Hurling Championship. A team representing Wexford has won the provincial title on 10 occasions.

The Wexford County Championship is an integral part of the wider Leinster Senior Club Hurling Championship. The winners of the Wexford county final join the champions of the other hurling counties to contest the provincial championship.

List of finals

Wins listed by club

Records and statistics

Managers
Managers in the Wexford Championship are involved in the day-to-day running of the team, including the training, team selection, and sourcing of players. Their influence varies from club-to-club and is related to the individual club committees. The manager is assisted by a team of two or three selectors and a backroom team consisting of various coaches.

Teams

By decade

The most successful teams of each decade, judged by number of Wexford Senior Hurling Championship titles, is as follows:

1910s: 2 each for Castlebridge (1910–19) and Blenbrien (1915–16)
1920s: 2 for Adamstown (1926–27)
1930s: 6 for Adamstown (1931-32-33-35-36-37)
1940s: 3 for Geraldine O'Hanrahans (1943-44-45)
1950s: 7 for St Aidan's Enniscorthy (1952-53-54-56-57-58-59)
1960s: 3 for Faythe Harriers (1960-62-65)
1970s: 6 for Rathnure (1971-72-73-74-77-79)
1980s: 6 for Buffers Alley (1982-83-84-85-88-89)
1990s: 3 each for Rathnure (1990-96-98) and Oulart–The Ballagh (1994-95-97)
2000s: 4 for Oulart–The Ballagh (2004-05-07-09)
2010s: 6 for Oulart–The Ballagh (2010-11-12-13-15-16)

Gaps

Top five longest gaps between successive championship titles:

76 years: St Anne's Rathangan (1924–2000)
42 years: Cloughbawn (1951–1993)
21 years: Geraldine O'Hanrahans (1945–1966)
20 years: Faythe Harriers (1981–2001)
16 years: Faythe Harriers (1965–1981)

References

External links
Official Wexford Website
Wexford on Hoganstand
Wexford Club GAA

 
Wexford GAA club championships
Hurling competitions in Leinster
Senior hurling county championships